Jenny Woodward is an Australian journalist.  She is currently weather presenter for ABC News in Queensland.

Career 
Woodward began her television career at DDQ-10 in Toowoomba where she produced and directed children's programmes, variety shows and special events. She was also a newsreader and weather presenter.

In 1986, Woodward joined ABC News in Queensland as weather presenter. She is believed to be Australia's longest serving weather presenter. 

Woodward also conducts frequent live broadcasts, including annual broadcasts from the Royal Queensland Show (colloquially 'Ekka'). She has been the compere of the nationally televised "Spirit of Christmas" concert series at the Queensland Performing Arts Centre for seven years.

She also regularly features on ABC News 24 as a weather presenter. 

In 2010, Woodward was approached by the Australian Labor Party to run as a candidate in the 2010 Australian Federal Election, but declined to change professions.

Personal life 
Woodward is one of six daughters of Bob and Laurie Mackie. She and her husband Doug, who have three sons, live in Brisbane.

Awards 
In 2004, Woodward won a Queensland Media Award.  

She was further honoured on 8 April 2008 when a species of geranium was named after her.  The Jenny Woodward Geranium is a pink flowered bush.

References

External links
 ABC News profile

ABC News (Australia) presenters
Living people
Year of birth missing (living people)